Jan Sokol (born 26 September 1990) is an Austrian former professional racing cyclist, who rode professionally between 2010 and 2016. He rode at the 2013 UCI Road World Championships.

Major results
2008
 4th Overall Giro della Lunigiana
2011
 1st Stage 1 (TTT) Sibiu Cycling Tour
2012
 7th Miskolc GP
 9th Ronde van Vlaanderen U23
2013
 2nd Miskolc GP
 2nd Banja Luka Belgrade I 
 3rd Banja Luka Belgrade II
 8th Croatia–Slovenia
2014
 1st Stage 3 An Post Rás

References

External links

1990 births
Living people
Austrian male cyclists
Cyclists from Vienna
European Games competitors for Austria
Cyclists at the 2015 European Games
21st-century Austrian people